Art McDonald may refer to:

 Arthur B. McDonald (born 1943), Canadian astrophysicist
 Art McDonald (admiral), officer in the Royal Canadian Navy